The British North Borneo dollar was the currency of British North Borneo from 1882 to 1953. It was subdivided into 100 cents. The dollar had remained at par with the Straits dollar (and its successor the Malayan dollar), the currency of Malaya and Singapore, at the value of one dollar to 2 shillings 4 pence sterling from its introduction until both currencies were replaced by the Malaya and British Borneo dollar in 1953. Both coins and banknotes were issued by the British North Borneo Company.

During the Japanese occupation period (1942–1945), paper money was issued in denominations ranging from 1 cent to 1000 dollars. This currency was fixed at 1 dollar = 1 Japanese yen, compared to a 1:2 pre-war rate. Following the war, the Japanese occupation currency was declared worthless and the previous issues of the British North Borneo dollar regained their value relative to sterling (two shillings four pence).

Coins 

Coins were first minted in values of  cent and 1 cent in copper, and later 1 cent,  cents, and 5 cents in copper-nickel, and 25 cents in silver. Originally they were issued under the name "British North Borneo Co", as The British North Borneo Company had the right to produce coin under its Royal Charter granted in 1881. Later they were minted under "State of North Borneo", starting in 1903. All coins depicted the company/state coat of arms on the obverse and denomination on the reverse. These were last minted in 1941 and later phased out and replaced by coins of the Malayan dollar.

Banknote 
The design of the banknotes did not change much during the currency's lifetime. However, their physical sizes tend to shrink over time. They either show the coat of arms, Mount Kinabalu, or both.

See also 

 Malayan dollar
 Postal orders of British North Borneo
 Sarawak dollar

References

External links 
 Global Financial Data currency histories table
 Online Coin Club / Coins from North Borneo

British North Borneo
Currencies of the British Empire
Currencies of Malaysia
Modern obsolete currencies
Obsolete currencies in Malaysian history
1882 establishments in the British Empire
1953 disestablishments